World Championship Wrestling (WCW) is a defunct American professional wrestling promotion that existed from 1988 to 2001. It began as a promotion affiliated with the National Wrestling Alliance (NWA) that appeared on the national scene under the ownership of media mogul Ted Turner and based in Atlanta, Georgia. Prior to the launch of WCW as a separate promotion, the "World Championship Wrestling" name was used for a television program produced by NWA promotions Georgia Championship Wrestling and Jim Crockett Promotions on TBS; the name came from an Australian wrestling promotion of the 1970s. 

In the 1990s, World Championship Wrestling, along with the World Wrestling Federation (WWF; now known as World Wrestling Entertainment (WWE)), were the top two wrestling promotions in the United States. Its flagship show WCW Monday Nitro went head-to-head with WWF Raw is War in a ratings battle known as the Monday Night Wars. However, poorly-received storylines, the increasing popularity of the WWF's Attitude Era, and restrictions from Time Warner eventually led to WCW's decline and eventual acquisition of key assets by its main competition, Vince McMahon and the WWF.

Years prior to Turner sale

Georgia Championship Wrestling and Black Saturday (1982–1985)
Although the "World Championship Wrestling" brand name was used by promoter Jim Barnett for his Australian promotion, the first promotion in the United States to use the brand on a wide scale was Georgia Championship Wrestling (GCW). GCW, owned primarily by Jack Brisco and Gerald Brisco and booked by Ole Anderson, was the first NWA territory to gain cable television access, being broadcast on Channel 17 of Ted Turner's Superstation TBS. The show was broadcast every Saturday evening, from 6:05 PM EST to 8:05 PM EST.

After founding his own company, Titan Sports Inc. in 1980, in 1982, Vincent K. McMahon purchased his father's Capitol Wrestling Corporation (CWC) and merged it into Titan Sports Inc. Under his leadership, the World Wrestling Federation (WWF) became the top promotion in North America, and GCW devised the name "World Championship Wrestling" in an effort to compete. In 1982, GCW changed the name of its television show to World Championship Wrestling since it was already starting to run shows in "neutral" territories such as Ohio, Pennsylvania and Michigan. These efforts helped to keep GCW competitive against the WWF, as both promotions had secured television deals and were trying to become national, as opposed to regional, entities. The WWF evenutally left the NWA and created the show WWF All American Wrestling. The NWA, led by the President of Mid-Atlantic Championship Wrestling, Jim Crockett Jr., countered by creating Starrcade in the fall of 1983, the main event of which featured Ric Flair defeating Harley Race in a critically acclaimed steel cage match to win the NWA World Heavyweight Championship. The success of Starrcade would elevate Flair to superstar status, as he would become known as JCP's franchise player during the mid-to-late 1980s, and succeeded in propelling the NWA.

In 1984, Hulk Hogan's world title victory at Madison Square Garden on January 23, as well as the creation of Tuesday Night Titans, allowed the WWF to maintain its market lead. On April 9, 1984, the Brisco brothers sold their shares in GCW, including their prime time slot on the TBS cable television network, to Vince McMahon. The WWF would take over GCW's timeslot on July 14, 1984, a day that would be later known as "Black Saturday". WWF's gimmick-based approach, in contrast to GCW's more athletic style, was negatively received by television viewers. Despite originally promising to produce original programming, WWF would instead feature highlights from its other programming. This move was a major factor in Turner's decision to discontinue showing the WWF. Meanwhile, Ole Anderson, who had refused to sell his shares in GCW to the WWF, teamed with fellow holdout shareholders Fred Ward and Ralph Freed to create Championship Wrestling from Georgia. Turner quickly secured a television deal with the new promotion, as well as with Bill Watts' Mid-South Wrestling based in Oklahoma.

Jim Crockett Promotions' move to TBS (1985–1986)
In March 1985, McMahon sold his TBS time slot and the "World Championship Wrestling" name to Jim Crockett Promotions (JCP), owned by Jim Crockett Jr., under pressure from Ted Turner. The WWF suffered no financial consequences from the TBS deal, and would go on to hold their first WrestleMania. The new World Championship Wrestling, which was now a combination of JCP (Mid-Atlantic Wrestling) and Championship Wrestling from Georgia, became a top rated show TBS, allowing Jim Crockett Jr. to become NWA President for the second time.

In 1986, Jim Crockett Promotions held the first Jim Crockett Sr. Memorial Cup, which showcased talent from various NWA territories. Bob Geigel would later become the NWA President once again, and would purchase Geigel's Heart of America Sports Attractions, promoters of the Central States territory, which owned the rights to promote wrestling shows through the states of Kansas, Missouri, and Iowa.

Going national (1987–1988)
In 1987, JCP would enter into an agreement to control Championship Wrestling from Florida, and Universal Wrestling Federation (which covered Oklahoma, Mississippi, Arkansas, Texas and Louisiana; by this time, the UWF had split from the NWA); this helped elevate Crockett to a third tenure as NWA President. The Florida and Mid-South territories (along with those companies' rosters of wrestlers) were absorbed into WCW. Jim Crockett Promotions now owned NWA St. Louis, the Universal Wrestling Federation, Mid-Atlantic, Central States Wrestling, Championship Wrestling from Georgia and Championship Wrestling from Florida as well.

Between the purchasing of several NWA territories, World Class Championship Wrestling in Texas leaving the NWA in 1986 (and later merging with Jerry Jarrett's Continental Wrestling Association in Memphis to create a new promotion, the United States Wrestling Association), JCP was the last NWA member with national television exposure. Although JCP and the NWA were still two separate legal entities, with Crockett as NWA President, Jim Crockett Promotions was allowed to use the NWA brand for promoting.

With the large amount of capital needed to take a wrestling promotion on a national tour, the various territorial acquisitions had drained JCP's coffers. Likewise, the WWF in the early 1980s suffered a large debt load, and its success was hinging on the reception to its pay-per-view events. In 1987, JCP marketed the fifth installment of Starrcade as the NWA's answer to the WWF's WrestleMania event. The WWF would counter-program with their first Survivor Series event on the same day. The WWF informed cable companies that if they chose to carry Starrcade, they would not be allowed to carry future WWF events. The vast majority of companies showed Survivor Series (only five opted to remain in contract with Crockett, resulting in only an $80,000 profit after expenses).

In January 1988, JCP promoted Bunkhouse Stampede, and McMahon counter-programmed with the first Royal Rumble on USA Network. Both NWA events achieved low buyrates and the decision to hold these events in Chicago and New York alienated the Crockett's main fanbase in the Carolinas, hampering their drawing power for arena shows in the Southeast.

Dusty Rhodes as booker and collapse (1988)
In 1984, Crockett had signed Dusty Rhodes and made him booker for World Championship Wrestling. Rhodes had a reputation for creativity and authored many memorable feuds, storylines, and gimmick matches like WarGames. Rhodes would be responsible for elevating up-and-coming wrestlers such as Sting, Ricky Steamboat, Magnum T. A., the Road Warriors (Hawk and Animal), and Nikita Koloff, among others, to superstardom. However, Rhodes would get involved in a political struggle with champion Ric Flair, and by 1988, after four years of competition with Vince McMahon, he was burned out. Rhodes' booking would be criticized for frequent non-endings to house shows, now known infamously as the "Dusty finish". One of the last creative aspects Dusty Rhodes initiated was the Clash of the Champions, on the night of WrestleMania IV. For a quarter-hour, the Ric Flair vs. Sting match gained more viewers than WrestleMania, and the match also saw Sting become a top player for WCW. Conversely, Rhodes planned at one point to have mid-card wrestler Rick Steiner defeat Ric Flair in a five-minute match at Starrcade for the NWA World Heavyweight Championship. Rhodes would be fired by the promotion after an angle he booked on November 26, where Road Warrior Animal pulled a spike out of his shoulder pad and jammed it in Rhodes's eye busting it wide open, despite a strict "no-blood" policy laid down by Turner after his recent purchase of the company.

First years under Ted Turner (1989–1993)

Jim Crockett Promotions was purchased outright by Turner on October 11, 1988. Originally incorporated by TBS as the Universal Wrestling Corporation, Turner promised fans that WCW would maintain the athlete-oriented style of the NWA. The sale was completed on November 2, 1988, with a television taping of NWA World Championship Wrestling that very same date in WCW's hometown of Atlanta.

1989 proved to be a turnaround year for WCW, with Ric Flair as both World Champion and head booker. Flair would bring in Ricky Steamboat and Terry Funk, and his pay-per-view matches with Steamboat were financially and critically successful. Young stars such as Sid Vicious, Sting, Scott Steiner, The Road Warriors, Brian Pillman, The Great Muta and Lex Luger were given major storylines and championship opportunities. In March 1990, however, Flair would be fired as head booker after WCW talent began to argue that Flair was booking things in his favor. One of these examples was Flair's refusal to drop the WCW World title to Lex Luger, as he had already promised to drop it to Sting, who himself had been injured earlier in the year. Despite high ratings climbed and had well-received shows, Flair would be eventually replaced by Ole Anderson as head booker.

Under Ole, WCW began to gradually incorporate much of the gimmicks for which the WWF was better known. These stunts included a cross-promotional appearance of RoboCop at Capital Combat in May 1990, the Chamber of Horrors gimmick, and the Black Scorpion storyline. House shows would drop to record lows as Ole continuously pushed older wrestlers who were loyal to him. Behind the scenes, WCW was becoming more autonomous and slowly started separating itself from the NWA. They would officially split from the NWA in January 1991, and began to recognize its own WCW World Heavyweight Championship and WCW World Tag Team Championship.

Both WCW and the NWA recognized Ric Flair as their World Heavyweight Champion throughout most of the first half of 1991. However, the recently installed WCW president Jim Herd, who was formerly the manager of the St. Louis TV station KPLR-TV and had also once been the regional manager of Pizza Hut, turned against Flair for various reasons. Flair would be fired before The Great American Bash in July 1991 after failed contract negotiations. In the process, they officially stripped him of the WCW World Heavyweight Championship. According to Flair's autobiography, they refused to return the $25,000 deposit he had put down on the physical belt, so he kept it and brought it with him when he was hired by the WWF at the request of Vince McMahon. Flair then incorporated the belt into his gimmick, dubbing himself "The Real World's Champion". WCW later renegotiated the use of the NWA name as a co-promotional gimmick with New Japan Pro-Wrestling and sued the WWF to stop showing Flair with the old NWA World Title belt on its programs, claiming a trademark on the physical design of the belt. The belt was returned to WCW by Flair when Jim Herd was let go. Flair eventually received his deposit which with interest was over $38,000. It was brought back as the revived NWA World Heavyweight Championship.

Meanwhile, the WCW's product fell into a decline in 1991 and 1992 under the presidency of the Herd. Ric Flair, who had conflicts with Herd, once stated that Herd "knew nothing about wrestling, other than the fact that the station he ran had a hot show" (referring to the once-popular show Wrestling at the Chase. which was broadcast by KPLR-TV while Herd was manager there). According to Flair, Herd also wanted him to drop his entire "Nature Boy" persona, shave his head (even though Flair's bleach blonde hair was one of his most recognizable trademarks) and adopt a Roman gladiator gimmick by the name of Spartacus in order to "change with the times". Creative committee member Kevin Sullivan was quoted as saying, "After we change Flair's gimmick, why don't we go to Yankee Stadium and change Babe Ruth's uniform number?". During contract renegotiation, Flair refused to take a pay cut, be moved away from the main event position, or drop the title to Lex Luger as Herd wanted. Flair instead offered to drop the title to fellow Horseman Barry Windham. Herd's other ideas were seen by many as a poor attempt to mimic the WWF's gimmick-oriented style. Stan Hansen was so insulted by the Desperados gimmick, a stable of bumbling cowboys, that he left WCW outright when he was asked to be part of the group.  Jim Cornette and Stan Lane would also depart from the promotion after having conflicts with Herd, thus breaking up the Midnight Express, and the Road Warriors would also leave in July 1990 because of conflicts with Herd.

Herd was fired in January 1992 and was succeeded by Kip Allen Frey. Frey's tenure running WCW was brief, and he would be replaced later in the year by "Cowboy" Bill Watts, who had formerly been the promoter for Mid-South Wrestling (later known as the Universal Wrestling Federation) and was the first head executive of WCW to have prior experience in the wrestling business since Jim Crockett left. Watts would controversially make top rope moves – which were commonly performed by stars such as Brian Pillman and the Steiner Brothers – illegal during wrestling matches  among other changes. After clashes with management over a number of issues, as well as feeling pressure from Hank Aaron over a racially sensitive piece of correspondence, and accusations of anti-semitism from Paul E. Dangerously and Scotty Flamingo (both of whom are Jewish), Watts resigned. He was subsequently replaced by Eric Bischoff.

Final split with the NWA (1993)
During the period that WCW operated with its own World Heavyweight Championship, while also recognizing the NWA's world title, Flair left the WWF on good terms and returned to WCW, regaining the NWA title from Barry Windham in July 1993. The title was later scheduled to be dropped by Flair to Rick Rude, a title change which was exposed by the pre-taping of matches at the Disney-MGM Studios, known as the Disney tapings. The NWA board of directors, working separately from WCW, objected to the title being changed without their vote and WCW left the NWA for good in September 1993. WCW still legally owned and used the actual belt which represented the NWA World Heavyweight Championship, however, and Rick Rude even defended it as the "Big Gold Belt", but they could no longer use the NWA name. The title thus became known as the WCW International World Heavyweight Championship as the World Heavyweight Championship as sanctioned by fictitious subsidiary WCW International. WCW claimed that WCW International still recognized the belt as a legitimate World Championship. For a short while, there were essentially two world titles up for competition in the organization, with Sting winning the WCW International title, while Flair captured the WCW World Heavyweight Championship from Big Van Vader. The two titles were unified by Flair in a match on June 23, 1994.

Eric Bischoff era (1993–1999) 

In February 1993, former commentator Eric Bischoff was appointed as Executive Vice President of WCW. Bischoff impressed Turner's top brass with his non-confrontational tactics and business savvy. Jim Ross, upset that a man who once answered to him was now his supervisor, requested and received a release from TBS executive Bill Shaw (after suggestion from Bischoff) and ended up in the WWF. Meanwhile, Dusty Rhodes and Ole Anderson were still in full creative control at this point, and WCW continued its decline under their watch.

The infamous "Lost in Cleveland" storyline began when Cactus Jack (Mick Foley) first wrestled Big Van Vader on April 6, 1993. Foley and Vader wanted an intense match, so they agreed that Vader would hit Cactus with a series of heavy blows to the face. WCW edited the match heavily because it was against their policies to show the heavy bleeding that resulted. Foley suffered a broken nose, a dislocated jaw and needed twenty-seven stitches, but won the match via countout. Because the title did not change hands on a countout, WCW booked a rematch. Foley, however, wanted some time off to be with his newborn daughter and get surgery to repair a knee injury. As a result, in the rematch with Vader on April 23, Vader removed the protective mats at ringside and power-bombed Cactus onto the exposed concrete floor, causing a legitimate concussion and causing Foley to temporarily lose sensation in his left foot and hand. While Foley was away, the angle saw Cactus Jack's absence was explained with him being was institutionalized, escaped, and developed amnesia. Foley had wanted the injury storyline to be very serious and generate genuine sympathy for him before his return. In response to the comedy vignettes that WCW produced, Foley jokes in his autobiography that they were the brainchild of WCW executives, who regarded a surefire moneymaking feud as a problem that needed to be solved.

On July 6, 1993, WCW began the aforementioned Disney Tapings. In order to save money, the promotion rented out a studio located at the Disney-MGM Studios in Orlando, Florida, and proceeded to tape its syndicated television programming months before it was to air on television. Wrestlers were often forced to appear on-camera with belts they would not actually win for several more months, exposing future WCW storylines to those in attendance (most of whom were tourists who had been coached to cheer and boo on cue). Footage of Rude with the NWA title shot at these tapings had caused the controversy with the NWA discussed above. Moreover, the tapings also caused confusion in the tag team division, as they had revealed that Arn Anderson and Paul Roma were to win the WCW World tag team titles from The Hollywood Blonds ("Stunning" Steve Austin and Flyin' Brian Pillman). The promotion attempted to swerve the fans at the live Beach Blast pay-per-view event in July and keep the titles on the Blonds, but the live Clash of the Champions XXIV show was to take place in August before the already-shot footage of Anderson and Roma as tag team champions was to begin circulating in late-August. However, before the Clash event, Pillman was injured and unable to wrestle, forcing Lord Steven Regal to replace him alongside Austin. Anderson and Roma won the titles, while the Blonds were broken up permanently.

In 1993, Ric Flair returned to WCW from his WWF tenure, but was constrained by a no-compete clause from his WWF contract. In response, he was given a talk show segment on WCW's television shows called "A Flair for the Gold," similar to the "Piper's Pit" segments starring "Rowdy" Roddy Piper. In a now-infamous segment of the talk show at the Clash XXIV, a "mystery partner" for the faces known as The Shockmaster (portrayed by Fred Ottman, previously known as "Typhoon" in the WWF) tripped through the wall and fell on his face, inadvertently rendering himself a joke character (despite winning some matches). Dusty Rhodes later claimed that a 2x4 was placed on the bottom of the wall, which had not been there on rehearsal, which caused Ottman to trip and stumble. By November 1993, WCW decided to once again base the promotion around Ric Flair, after prospective top babyface Sid was involved in an incident with Arn Anderson that resulted in the hospitalization of both men  while on tour in England, eight weeks before Starrcade, and was fired. Flair then placed his career on the line against Big Van Vader for the WCW World Heavyweight Championship. Flair won the title at Starrcade and was once again made booker. That did not stop WCW from suffering massive financial losses in 1993, however; a staggering $23 million.

Competition with the WWF 

Beginning in 1994, Bischoff aggressively recruited high-profile former stars from WWF, such as Hulk Hogan and "Macho Man" Randy Savage, using Turner's monetary resources. Due to their high profiles, Hogan and Savage were able to demand concessions, such as multi-year, multimillion-dollar contracts and creative control over their characters. This would later become a problem for WCW, as other wrestlers were able to make similar demands, and contract values soared. Hogan in particular was able to gain considerable influence through a friendship with Bischoff; including a fee of $700,000 per pay-per-view appearance, plus 25% of the gross revenue from the pay-per-view whether it was successful or not.

WCW's first major pay-per-view event for Hogan's was Bash at the Beach, saw the former WWF mainstay defeat Ric Flair for the WCW World Heavyweight Championship. During their time in WWF from 1991 to 1992, a feud was teased between them, but a match originally planned for WrestleMania VIII never came to fruition. WCW's event drew a high buyrate due to mainstream intrigue and hype. In December 1994, Savage would make his WCW debut; and in 1995, a new pay-per-view event called Uncensored was created and WCW would also revive The Great American Bash, which had not aired since 1992.

In a mid-1995 meeting, Turner asked Bischoff how WCW could compete with McMahon's WWF. Bischoff, not expecting Turner to comply, said that the only way would be a prime-time slot on a weekday night, possibly up against the WWF's flagship show, Monday Night Raw. Turner granted him a live hour on TNT every Monday night. The new weekly show, WCW Monday Nitro, debuted on September 4, 1995, live from the Mall of America in Bloomington, Minnesota, in a timeslot that specifically overlapped with Raw. Bischoff himself was initially the host, alongside Bobby Heenan and ex-NFL star Steve "Mongo" McMichael. The initial broadcast of Nitro featured the surprise return of Lex Luger (who had been in the WWF since 1993) to the WCW audience. Because Nitro was live at the time, premiering major stars on the show would signal to the fans the amount of excitement the broadcasts would contain. Luger himself had come off a successful run in the WWF, and became one of the company's top stars. Luger had been employed with the WWF as recently as a week before his Nitro appearance, he had wrestled on a house show for the WWF in Halifax, Nova Scotia the night before his appearance on Nitro) The significance of this event would lead to the beginning of a period that would be known as the "Monday Night Wars".

Nitro was successful enough that it was expanded to two live hours in May 1996, and later three in February 1998. Early on, Bischoff would give away Raw results on Nitro, as Raw, unlike Nitro, was then mostly taped in advance. Another famous jab at the WWF was takent on December 18, 1995, when the reigning WWF Women's Champion Debrah Miceli (who had previously competed in WCW as "Madusa") returned to the promotion as her WWF character Alundra Blayze and, live on Nitro, denounce the Blayze character and throw the WWF Women's title belt in a trash can, reclaiming her "Madusa" moniker in the process. In response, The WWF created the "Billionaire Ted" skits, which featured parodies of Ted Turner ("Billionaire Ted"), Hulk Hogan ("The Huckster"), Randy Savage ("The Nacho Man"), and WCW interviewer "Mean Gene" Okerlund ("Scheme Gene"). Turner would later admit that he was not offended by the skits, and instead found them funny.

Dominance (1996–1998) 
On Memorial Day 1996, Scott Hall, who had wrestled in the WWF as Razor Ramon, interrupted a match by walking down through the crowd into the ring. He then delivered his "You want a war?" speech: "You people know who I am," he began, "but you don't know why I'm here." Hall said that he and two of his associates were going to "take over." Many thought he meant Bret Hart and Shawn Michaels, then still with WWF. Hall challenged the best WCW wrestlers to stand up and defend the company against their onslaught. The next week, Hall reappeared on Nitro to pestered the WCW announcers before Sting confronted him and slaped Hall across the face. In response, Hall promised Sting a "BIG surprise" the next week in Wheeling, West Virginia, which ended up being Hall's friend and former WWF Champion Kevin Nash. Nash delivered his own speech, referring to WCW's slogan of "Where The Big Boys Play" with the response "We didn't come here to play," and warning that "The measuring stick just changed here...you're looking at it." In the weeks following, Hall and Nash were collectively referred to as "The Outsiders." Both men took to showing up unexpectedly during Nitro broadcasts, attacking wrestlers and distracting wrestlers, and causing various disruptions.

The WWF would later file a lawsuit, alleging that the nWo storyline implied that Hall and Nash were invaders sent by Vince McMahon to destroy WCW. The WWF also claimed Scott Hall acted in a manner too similar to the Razor Ramon character which was owned by the WWF. At The Great American Bash, Nash confirmed on camera that the Outsiders were not employed by the WWF. Despite this, the lawsuit dragged out for several years before being settled out of court. One of the settlement's terms was the right for the WWF to bid on WCW's properties, should they ever be up for liquidation.

Eventually, the Outsiders announced the forthcoming appearance of a third member. At Bash at the Beach 1996, Hall and Nash were scheduled to team with their mystery partner against Lex Luger, Randy Savage and Sting. Hulk Hogan came to the ring in the climax of the match and leg dropped Savage, revealing himself to be the Outsiders' third man. Giving an interview with Okerlund directly after the match, Hogan claimed the reason for the turn was that he was tired of fans that had turned on him. Hogan referred to himself and the Outsiders as a "new world organization of wrestling". The New World Order (nWo) would subsequentally begin feuds with wrestlers loyal to WCW. According to Bischoff, the original plan was to have Sting be revealed as the third man rather than Hogan. Hogan convinced Bischoff to make him the third man instead, with the reasoning that the third man needed to have WWF name value, much like Hall and Nash did, and because of Hogan's success as the face of the WWF in the 1980s and early 1990s. Hogan's heel turn marked the first time in over 15 years that he portrayed a villainous character.

With most of the WCW roster over in Japan, the nWo took over the September 23, 1996, episode of Nitro, including the broadcast booth and the ring announcer's role. Largely due to the nWo angle, Nitro would go on to beat Raw for 84 consecutive weeks in the ratings.

Road to Starrcade 1997 

In 1997, the nWo began feuding with the revived babyface Four Horsemen as well as the returning Sting. Following a lengthy absence, Sting returned to WCW television as a darker, brooding character, in a gimmick based on The Crow. Sting would be in the rafters of WCW arenas, and sometimes rappel down into the ring to help WCW wrestlers fight the nWo. This latter feud served to build up Starrcade in December, headlined by Sting facing Hogan for the WCW World Heavyweight Championship. Culminating a 15-month storyline, the event drew WCW's largest buyrate.

Retrospective reviewers considered 1997 to be WCW's peak year, however, Starrcade  was heavily criticized for not having a clean finish to the WCW World Heavyweight Championship match. A recently introduced Bret Hart, who had refereed the preceding match between Bischoff and Larry Zbyszko for control of Nitro, alleged that referee Nick Patrick had performed a fast count on Sting and wanted to "make things right". Hart insisted that the match continue with himself as referee, in order to prevent Sting from being "screwed" like Hart had legitimately been at the 1997 Survivor Series the month prior; an incident that came at the end of his run with the WWF. Bischoff himself would admit in his memoir Controversy Creates Cash, the count looked like a normal count, and replays of the three-count on later shows had the video sped up to hide this. Because of this, Starrcade has also been seen by critics as the beginning of WCW's downfall.

According to Bret Hart, WCW failed to capitalize on his talent and momentum, and had no idea how to properly utilize him. Bischoff contends that the Montreal Screwjob  "...had taken his toll on him," in his autobiography. "It was all he talked about... constantly."

Signs of a decline (1998–2001) 

Turner sought to capitalize on WCW's momentum by launching a new Thursday night show on TBS called Thunder. In the aftermath of Starrcade, Sting was stripped of the WCW title on the debut episode of WCW Thunder on January 8, 1998; Hogan and Sting would face each other again for the vacant championship at SuperBrawl VIII the following month. Sting's presence on the main card would soon begin to fade, and his drawing power would also decrease. Meanwhile, dissension within the nWo led to the group splitting into the Hogan-led heel nWo Hollywood faction and the opposing, Nash-led, face nWo Wolfpac faction.

Meanwhile, WWF revamped its creative approach under the "WWF Attitude" moniker, elevating stars like Steve Austin, The Rock, Triple H and his DX group, Mankind, and Kane. Austin's feud with Vince McMahon's heel character, "Mr. McMahon", led to the April 13, 1998 episode of Raw, headlined by a match between Austin and McMahon, beating Nitro in the Nielsen ratings for the first time in 84 weeks.

Ex-NFL player Bill Goldberg was portrayed as an invincible monster with a long winning streak of squash matches. One of Nitro'''s rating wins was on July 6, 1998, when Goldberg's defeated Hulk Hogan to win the WCW world title at Georgia Dome in Atlanta. Despite strong ratings, the decision to air the Goldberg-Hogan title match on television, rather than pay-per-view, was scrutinized.

The September 14, 1998 episode of Nitro would also drew strong ratings due to Ric Flair's return to WCW to reform the Four Horsemen; Flair had been absent for a brief period prior to this due to legitimate conflicts with Eric Bischoff. Nitro ended the night with a 4.5 rating, as opposed to the 4.0 rating attained by Raw. Conversely, WCW would take another hit when their Halloween Havoc event, held on October 25, 1998, ran longer than the time allocated. Because of the last-minute addition of a tag team title match between Scott Steiner and The Giant against Rick Steiner and Buff Bagwell, several thousand viewers lost the pay-per-view feed at 11pm during the world title match between Diamond Dallas Page and Goldberg. The following night, the entire match would air for free on Nitro, leading to the program winning in the ratings for the final time.

At Starrcade, Kevin Nash, who was appointed WCW's head booker, set himself up to defeat Goldberg for the world title. In the climax, Scott Hall ran in and tased Goldberg with a cattle prod, enabling Nash to pick up the win, end Goldberg's streak, and become the champion. The main event finish was universally panned by critics. On the January 4, 1999, episode of Nitro, a Starrcade rematch between Nash and Goldberg was booked. However, Goldberg was kayfabe arrested by the police for stalking Miss Elizabeth and was replaced by the returning Hogan, who had been absent from WCW for several months prior after he claimed to retire from professional wrestling. Prior to the match, play-by-play announcer Tony Schiavone, under direction from Bischoff, revealed that Mick Foley, portraying his "Mankind" character, would be win the WWF Championship on a taped edition of Raw, sarcastically saying "huh, that's gonna put some butts in the seats". Foley had worked for WCW but left in 1994 after deciding Bischoff would never give him a prominent role in the company. Nielsen ratings indicated that over 300,000 households changed the channel to watch Foley's victory.

The Nitro main event saw Hogan poke Nash in the chest. Nash oversold the poke in the chest by forcefully falling to the mat and allowing Hogan to pin him for the WCW World Heavyweight Championship. This effectively united the two separate nWo factions into a new faction, the nWo Elite. Goldberg made his way down to the ring along with Lex Luger during the celebration, only for Luger blindside the former and Hall taser him again. The segment became infamously known as the "Fingerpoke of Doom", with critics and retrospective reviewers condemning WCW for their bait-and-switch tactics which ultimately damaged the credibility of the company as a whole.

 Decline (1998–1999)

1998 saw WCW slid into a period of creative decline, leading to a loss of viewership. The company was criticized for their overuse of celebrities in pay-per-view matches, such as Dennis Rodman and Jay Leno, and frequent product placement, such as Rick Steiner trading barbs with Chucky in a segment promoting the 1998 film Bride of Chucky.

WCW was well known for having popular, young midcard stars; such as Chris Jericho, Eddie Guerrero, Chris Benoit, Dean Malenko, Raven, Billy Kidman, Chavo Guerrero Jr., Perry Saturn, Booker T, and Rey Mysterio. They were also credited for their cruiserweight division featuring high-flying stars from Mexico and Japan, where the style of wrestling was popularized. In spite of this, WCW did not promote its younger stars to the top slots (a charge admitted by Bischoff) and were kept away from the main event scene, yet WCW's top-level stars had no motivation to perform due to their long-term contracts. Out of the younger talent listed, many of its stars would become main event-level world champions in the WWF/E several years later after WCW's demise.

Talents were reportedly signed to keep them from appearing on WWF television. Bischoff recruited former WWF star The Ultimate Warrior to feud with Hogan and capitalize on the Hogan/Warrior match at WrestleMania VI. Their October 1998 rematch at Halloween Havoc was considered as one of the worst matches in pay-per-view history, and, interest soon dissipated after several unrealistic segments involving the two were aired on WCW programming. Warrior also insisted on elaborate and costly apparatuses, such as a trapdoor in the ring which badly injured The British Bulldog when he landed on it awkwardly earlier in the event. Warrior would disappear from WCW programming shortly afterwards.

According to Bischoff's autobiography Controversy Creates Cash, Time Warner increasingly micromanaged WCW, severely hindering (and occasionally overriding) Bischoff's control of the company. Time Warner initially gave him slight restrictions as to what he was and was not allowed to do with WCW but these restrictions mounted as time passed. By the summer of 1998, he was outright ordered to tilt WCW's programming to a more "family-friendly" output. This forced shift came while the WWF, buoyed by "Attitude" era, was regularly beating WCW in the ratings. Like the other companies under Time Warner ownership, WCW was forced to slash their budget, putting even more strain on the company. Bischoff maintains that the restrictions and mandates placed on WCW was done because many executives in WCW ownership — from the Turner-owned era to the AOL Time Warner years – hated wrestling and attempted to remove the company entirely.

By late 1999, WCW began losing around $5 million a month as attendance, pay-per-view buys and ratings were down significantly. Failed angles and gimmicks during this time included a push for the 1970s rock group KISS, a storyline involving rapper Master P and The No Limit Soldiers, and a failed contest to find a new member of the Nitro Girls.

KISS had collaborated with WCW to promote The Demon, a gimmick created in the band's image originally portrayed by Brian Adams and then by Dale Torborg. As a way of introducing The Demon, KISS closed out an episode of Nitro with a live performance of their hit song "God of Thunder", during which The Demon made his debut. The segment was one of lowest-rated in the history of Nitro, and the Demon character quickly lost its momentum. As part of the deal with KISS, The Demon was contractually obligated to receive a main-event match on a pay-per-view, a stipulation WCW fulfilled by having him lose to midcard wrestler The Wall in under four minutes at SuperBrawl 2000. Meanwhile, the hip hop music-inspired No Limit Soldiers were introduced as part of a music-themed angle, pitting them against the country music-themed stable The West Texas Rednecks. Despite the fact that the No Limit Soldiers were presented as babyfaces, WCW's mostly Southern audience rejected them and cheered the villainous, rap-hating West Texas Rednecks instead.

Harvey Schiller, who served as the president of Turner Sports at the time and acted as Eric Bischoff's superior, had Bischoff removed from control of the promotion on September 10, 1999. With Bischoff's removal, an announced "million-dollar contest" was later cancelled, a planned Nitro animated series was scrapped, and the Road Wild pay-per-view event (a Bischoff creation) would also be discontinued.

 Vince Russo (1999–2000) 

Bischoff was replaced by then-WCW Vice President of Strategic Planning Bill Busch, who was named Senior Vice President. Busch would bring in former WWF head writer Vince Russo and his colleague Ed Ferrara. Russo and Ferrera presented themselves as the brains behind the "Attitude Era", and were offered them lucrative contracts to come to WCW in October 1999. Russo and Ferrara tried to replicate the same writing format (known as "Crash TV") they had used in the WWF, but at a more accelerated pace, and would also push the younger talents to phase out aging stars.

Russo and Ferrara struggled to gain approval for some of their ideas from WCW management, such as a "Piñata on a Pole" match between Mexican wrestlers on November 15. In late 1999, Russo and Ferrera revived the nWo as the nWo 2000, this time with Jeff Jarrett and Bret Hart at the helm. They next targeted WWF announcer Jim Ross with a parody character called "Oklahoma," who was played onscreen by Ferrara and would go on to win the WCW Cruiserweight Championship.  Ross suffered from Bell's palsy, and the character lampooned his resultant facial defects. The gimmick was very poorly received by many within the wrestling community, claiming that the character was in bad taste (and even sparking a legitimate feud between Ed Ferrara and Jim Cornette, one of Ross' close friends). Russo himself became an on-screen character whose face was never shown on camera; only his hand and the back of his chair were ever actually seen. This became part of a recurring theme as "worked shoots" became regular occurrences on WCW programming as a way of blurring the lines between what was legitimate and what was not.

In December 1999, Bret Hart suffered a career-ending concussion during a match with Goldberg. Goldberg himself would slice open a major artery in his forearm less than a week later, while punching through a limousine window in Salisbury, Maryland, as part of a storyline that was written by Russo. Russo and Ferrara were suspended three months later amid rumors that they wanted to make former UFC fighter Tank Abbott the WCW World Heavyweight Champion. Abbott, despite his legitimate fighting background, had little wrestling experience and had failed to connect with WCW audiences. Kevin Sullivan, who had been on and off as a booker over the course of several years, was appointed as the new head writer in the interim.

The new writing team attempted to appease fans by having Chris Benoit win the WCW World Heavyweight Championship at Souled Out in January 2000. However, Benoit was among a group of wrestlers who expressed their intent to leave the company prior to the show because Sullivan was not particularly fond of them. Benoit, in particular, had a personal grievance with Sullivan dating back several months as a storyline with the two that involved Benoit winning the services of Sullivan's manager, Woman (Sullivan's then-wife Nancy), led to an extramarital affair that resulted in a real life relationship developing between Benoit and Woman. Eddie Guerrero, Dean Malenko, and Perry Saturn among several others, voiced their grievances to Busch, who initially agreed to take Sullivan off Nitro and Thunder, only to turn around and tell them they were all being sent home except Benoit. In retaliation, Benoit handed the belt back after winning it and he, along with Guerrero, Malenko, and Saturn, signed with the WWF the next day; becoming popularly known as "The Radicalz". As a result, Busch was fired as Senior Vice President and replaced by Turner programming executive Brad Siegel.

On February 11, 2000, 12 wrestlers, including African American wrestler Hardbody Harrison and Japanese-American manager Sonny Onoo launched racial discrimination lawsuits against WCW, charging that, as a result of their ethnicities, they had not been pushed, had not been paid as well as other wrestlers and personalities, and had been given offensive gimmicks. It has since been speculated that these charges led to fellow African American Booker T winning the WCW World Heavyweight Championship later that year, and his real-life brother Stevie Ray being made a color commentator; Stevie Ray himself acknowledged that it may have been a factor. Onoo claimed that he had been given a disrespectful gimmick and that his final salary—$160,000—was only half of the average pay for a wrestler at that time.

 Final year (2000–2001)

In April 2000, with ratings hitting new lows, Russo and Bischoff were reinstated by WCW. In another attempt to get WCW's creative product turned around, they decided to "reboot" WCW into a more modern, streamlined company. All angles taking place at the time were immediately dropped and all championships were vacated.

The first major storyline to take place following the reboot saw Bischoff and Russo form an on-screen union that stood up for the younger talent in the company (which they dubbed the New Blood) in their battle against the Millionaire's Club, which consisted of the older, higher-paid, and more visible stars such as Hogan, Sting, and Diamond Dallas Page. Though initially well received, reception to the storyline quickly declined when the New Blood were cast as heels against the face Millionaire's Club. Many saw the casting as an attempt to gain sympathy towards the veterans, in spite of the already bad reputations they had gained behind the scenes. The New Blood was disbanded before their eponymous pay-per-view event, New Blood Rising.

Although neither was a trained wrestler, both Russo and actor David Arquette each won the WCW World Heavyweight Championship, the latter in order to promote the film Ready to Rumble. Arquette was vehemently against winning the championship, believing that fans, like himself, would detest a non-wrestler winning the title as neither looked physically capable of defeating actual wrestlers in a match. In WWE's The Rise and Fall of WCW documentary, Jim Ross said that Arquette winning the championship was a "farce" and an "embarrassment", and David Crockett, the brother of Jim Crockett Jr. who worked as one of WCW's backstage producers, said that WCW might as well "throw [the title] in the trash can".

Goldberg turned heel for the first time in his career at The Great American Bash, but his subsequent feud with Kevin Nash, and a failed attempt to duplicate his original streak, greatly diminished Goldberg's drawing power.

Vince Russo had many behind-the-scenes conflicts with Hulk Hogan as he still believed that Hogan's time in the spotlight was over. Hogan was viewed as "jobber to the stars", losing to main-event wrestlers such as Sting and Goldberg, as well as to Billy Kidman, whom Russo had Hogan feud with in an attempt to elevate Kidman. Hogan also appeared less frequently on WCW programming during this time. When it was announced that Hogan would be facing Jeff Jarrett for the WCW World Heavyweight Championship at Bash at the Beach, Hogan invoked his creative control and demanded that he win the match and the title. Russo agreed to the finish, but added that the finish would involve Jarrett simply laying down for Hogan to pin him, which Hogan strongly disagreed with. During the actual match, Russo came down to the ring and threw the title belt at Hogan's feet. Hogan broke character, infamously saying, "Is this your idea, Russo? That's why this company is in the damn shape it's in, because of bullshit like this!" Moments after Hogan pinned Jarrett to win the match, Russo came back out and immediately voided Hogan's title win before delivering a shoot speech aimed at Hogan, during which he referred to Hogan as a "piece of shit" and that the fans would "never see [him] again", effectively firing Hogan live on pay-per-view. This eventually led to Hogan filing a defamation of character lawsuit, which was dismissed in 2002.

Infuriated by Russo's actions, which conflicted with his intentions for Bash, Bischoff departed once more in July 2000. At the New Blood Rising pay-per-view on August 13, an injured Goldberg walked out of a triple threat elimination contest against Kevin Nash and Scott Steiner, violating the script of the match, and leaving Steiner to wrestle and lose to Nash by himself. Goldberg then swore at Russo on his way back to the dressing room on-camera. As a result of Goldberg's actions, the storyline was changed to a rivalry between Steiner and Goldberg, culminating in a match at Fall Brawl in September 2000, which Steiner won. Immediately afterward, Russo informed Goldberg that if he ever lost another match, he would be released from his WCW contract. However, this was an opportunity for Goldberg to heal from previous injuries and Russo was gone from the promotion entirely by late 2000, leaving former All Japan Pro Wrestling star Johnny Ace to replace him. During this time, a short-lived crossover feud began involving stars of WCW and Battle Dome.

At the Sin pay-per-view on January 14, 2001, Goldberg and his trainer DeWayne Bruce lost a tag team match to Totally Buffed (Buff Bagwell and The Total Package). This was Goldberg's final appearance for WCW before the company was purchased by the WWF. The final WCW event to be held outside the southern United States was the January 29 edition of WCW Monday Nitro from Baltimore, Maryland and its associated taping of WCW Thunder (which took place the same night). Following this, all future WCW events were held in the Southern United States. In addition, most female personalities were released from the promotion by the beginning of February 2001 in an attempt to cut costs.

 Attempted Bischoff/Fusient purchase (2001)
Time Warner bought out Turner Broadcasting System in 1996. WCW was losing between $12 million–$17 million a year at this point (and $60 million in 2000 alone). When America Online (AOL) merged with Time Warner in 2001, Ted Turner was effectively forced out. AOL Time Warner looked to sell the promotion and a sale nearly occurred in early 2001 to Bischoff and a group of private investors, calling themselves Fusient Media Ventures, with news reports and even Bischoff declaring a deal was in place. However, Fusient backed out when Turner networks head Jamie Kellner formally cancelled all WCW programming from its television networks. As Fusient's offer depended on being able to continue to air WCW programming on the Turner networks, the deal fell through. According to Bischoff in his book, WCW had also received offers from Fox and NBC. Kellner believed that wrestling did not fit the demographics of either TBS or TNT and would not be favorable enough to get the "right" advertisers to buy airtime, even though Thunder was the highest-rated show on TBS at the time. In the book NITRO: The Incredible Rise and Inevitable Collapse of Ted Turner's WCW by Guy Evans, it is said that a key condition in WCW's purchase deal with Fusient was that Fusient wanted control over time slots on TNT and TBS networks, regardless of whether these slots would show WCW programming or not. This influenced Kellner's decision to ultimately cancel WCW programming. WCW's losses were then written-off via purchase accounting; according to Evans: "in the post-merger environment, the new conglomerate was able to 'write down' money losing operations, essentially eliminating those losses because of their irrelevancy moving forward."

 Acquisition by the World Wrestling Federation and aftermath 
On March 23, 2001, all of WCW's trademarks and archived video library, as well as a select twenty-four contracts, were sold to Vince McMahon and World Wrestling Federation Entertainment, Inc. through its subsidiary, WCW, Inc. WCW's intangible properties were purchased for $3 million. Most of the main event-level stars including Ric Flair, Goldberg, Kevin Nash, and Sting were contracted directly to parent company AOL Time Warner instead of WCW, and thus AOL Time Warner was forced to continue to pay many of the wrestlers for years. The company's legal name reverted to Universal Wrestling Corporation; it would remain listed as a subsidiary of Time Warner until December 16, 2017, when it was merged into Turner Broadcasting System.

TNT aired the final Nitro episode from Panama City Beach, Florida which had been scheduled for the following Monday on March 26. McMahon opened the last-ever episode of WCW Monday Nitro with a simulcast with WWF Monday Night Raw, which aired from Cleveland, Ohio. The final WCW World Heavyweight Championship match for the show and the company saw WCW United States Heavyweight Champion Booker T defeat Scott Steiner to win the WCW World Heavyweight Championship. The main event featured Sting defeating Ric Flair with the Scorpion Deathlock as a culmination of their trademark feud, then both men embraced one another at the match's conclusion. This was a direct parallel to the very first Nitro episode, where Sting vs. Flair was also featured. After the Sting/Flair match, Vince appeared on Raw to close Nitro and to declare victory over WCW. Vince's son Shane McMahon then appeared on Nitro, declaring that it was actually he who had bought WCW. This initiated a storyline in which Shane led a WCW invasion of the WWF. The last WCW broadcast was the already-taped final episode of WCW WorldWide which aired in syndication six days after the final Nitro broadcast (one day before WrestleMania X-Seven, although several stations aired it in the early hours of the day of the event).

There were many aborted attempts to run WCW-branded events (including a proposed Saturday night timeslot that later evolved into WWF Excess and then WWE Velocity) and the WWF only ran a handful of matches on Raw and SmackDown! under the WCW banner which were ill-received by fans.  On the very first WCW-brand main event between Booker T and Buff Bagwell the crowd cheered when the WWF heels Stone Cold Steve Austin and Kurt Angle ran in to jump the WCW face Booker T. This would also cause Bagwell to be fired from the WWF after only one week of employment.

In 2004, WWE Home Video released a DVD called The Monday Night Wars. The objectivity of the DVD's content was questioned, as some believed the documentary was simply telling the WWE side of the story. On August 25, 2009, WWE released The Rise and Fall of WCW on DVD. The DVD looked back at the roots of WCW during the days of GCW and Mid-Atlantic Championship Wrestling, to the glory days of Monday Nitro and the nWo, and to its demise and sale to WWE. This DVD included several new interviews from Vince McMahon, Jim Crockett, Ric Flair, Dusty Rhodes, Bill Goldberg, as well as many of those responsible for running the NWA and WCW. Archive interviews were included from former WCW talent such as Hulk Hogan and Eric Bischoff, due to their respective contracts with Total Nonstop Action Wrestling (TNA) not allowing them to provide fresh interviews for WWE. In 2014, WWE Network premiered The Monday Night War: WWE vs. WCW, a documentary series that covered a much broader scope, and provided more equal viewpoints for both WWE and WCW.

 Further reading 

 
 
 
 
 
 
 
 
 
 The Monday Night War - WWE RAW vs. WCW Nitro'', (2004), World Wrestling Entertainment, ASIN B0001CCXCA.

References 

History of television
Cultural history of the United States
History of WWE
World Championship Wrestling
History of professional wrestling
History of companies of the United States

th:เวิลด์แชมเปี้ยนชิพเรสต์ลิง#ประวัติ